The Patuxent River is a tributary of the Chesapeake Bay in the state of Maryland.  There are three main river drainages for central Maryland:  the Potomac River to the west passing through Washington, D.C., the Patapsco River to the northeast passing through Baltimore, and the Patuxent River between the two.  The   Patuxent watershed had a rapidly growing population of 590,769 in 2000. It is the largest and longest river entirely within Maryland, and its watershed is the largest completely within the state.

Geography
The river source,  from the Chesapeake, is in the hills of the Maryland Piedmont near the intersection of four counties – Howard, Frederick, Montgomery and Carroll, and only  from Parr's Spring, the source of the south fork of the Patapsco River. Flowing in a generally southeastward direction, the Patuxent crosses the urbanized corridor between Baltimore and Washington, D.C., and opens up into a navigable tidal estuary near the colonial seaport of Queen Anne in Prince George's County, Maryland, just southeast of Bowie.

It marks the boundary between Montgomery, Prince George's, Charles and St. Mary's counties on the west and Howard, Anne Arundel, and Calvert counties on the east.

The two largest cities in the watershed are Bowie and Laurel, Maryland. There is a percentage of agricultural activity in the region as well. The mid and lower banks of the river have swamp and marshland ecosystems. Many of those ecosystems are protected by some form of parkland, on the state and local levels. The most notable of which include Jug Bay Wetlands Sanctuary, Merkle Wetlands Sanctuary in the Edgar A. Merkle Wildlife Refuge,<ref>Meyer, Eugene L., The Legacy of Edgar Merkle: Canada Geese on the Patuxent, The Washington Post, August 18, 1984 </ref> and Patuxent River Park, along with many more. Farther north, there is the 20 square mile Patuxent Research Refuge, which helps to protect Patuxent River wildlife.

Tributaries
The Little Patuxent River, the Middle Patuxent River, and the Western Branch are the three largest tributaries. The Middle Patuxent flows into the Little Patuxent just upstream from the historic Savage Mill in Savage. The Little Patuxent then joins the Patuxent just southwest of Crofton. The Middle Patuxent flows  through the middle of Howard County, while the Little Patuxent flows  through northeast and southeast Howard County and western Anne Arundel County. Western Branch originates under the name Folly Branch in the Wingate Drive area of the northern part of Glenn Dale, assuming the name "Western Branch" in Woodmore, continuing southward through Prince George's County, joined by Collington Branch before it joins the Patuxent near Upper Marlboro.

History
Native Americans have lived along the Patuxent River since at least 1100 BC. An archaeological dig at Pig Point (just north of Jug Bay at the end of Wrighton Road ) uncovered some of the oldest known artifacts in the Mid Atlantic states, including pottery, arrow and spear points, and remnants of wigwams, fires and foodways. The site was probably a center of trade in the region and has one of the best unbroken archaeological records on the East Coast. The Pig Point site includes remnants of the oldest structures ever found in Maryland, wigwam post holes dating to the third century.

The word Patuxent is derived from the Algonquin language used by the indigenous people living in the area prior to the arrival of the European settlers. Its meaning is debated. According to some sources it means "water running over loose stones" while others believe it means the "place where tobacco grows".

The Patuxent River was first named ("Pawtuxunt") on the detailed map resulting from the 1608 voyage upriver by Jamestown, Virginia settler John Smith.
Captain Smith got as far as the rough vicinity of the present-day Merkle Wildlife Sanctuary (Lyons Creek) area,  from the Chesapeake near what is now the Anne Arundel–Calvert–Prince George's County tripoint.
This was most likely the second visit by Europeans to the Patuxent, as in June 1588 a small Spanish expedition under Vicente Gonzalez is believed to have anchored for the night in the Patuxent mouth.

The river was an important colonial shipping port with the government's garrison situated at the mouth of the river where Charles Calvert was first Collector in 1673."Archives of Maryland Historical List Collectors, 1673-1776." Source: Edward C. Papenfuse, et al., Archives of Maryland, Historical List, new series, Vol. 1. Annapolis, MD: Maryland State Archives, 1990. Maryland State Archives website Retrieved 11 March 2019. In 1699, Thomas Browne, a Patuxent Ranger, followed the river from the Snowden plantation to where Clarksville is sited. In 1702 George Plater I was the Patuxent naval officer (later based at Sotterley Plantation), having earlier served as Collector after Calvert, Rousby, Sewall, Digges, and Payne held the collectorship.
By the mid and late seventeenth century respectively, colonists spread upriver to Mt. Calvert and Billingsley Point, two 18th-century mansions  upriver from the Chesapeake that are today part of Patuxent River Park. By 1705, the Snowden iron ore furnace (also known as the Patuxent Iron Works) just southeast of Laurel,
was shipping "pig iron" downriver from the current vicinity of the 1783 Montpelier Mansion, also part of Patuxent River Park.

In August 1814, Commodore Joshua Barney and his Chesapeake Bay Flotilla were trapped in the Patuxent by the British fleet under Admiral Sir George Cockburn. To keep them from British hands, Barney's men ignited the magazines of his ships in the four mile (6 km) stretch above Pig Point ( upriver from the Chesapeake when the British approached. From there, the troops marched through Nottingham, Upper Marlboro, Bladensburg, and on to Washington.

Economy and commerce
Tobacco farming dominated the Patuxent's economy for the two centuries following white settlement, with about sixty percent of Maryland's tobacco coming from the Patuxent valley by the late eighteenth century.

Destruction of the plantations by the British and of the soil by centuries of tobacco farming brought the mid and lower Patuxent valley into a period of decline that would last until the 1930s, when there were fewer residents in the Patuxent's Calvert County than there were in the 1840s, and only a few hundred more than in the first Calvert County census in 1790.

The Patuxent was plied by regular steamship service, mostly from the Weems Line, from the 1820s to the 1920s, replacing the schooners and sailing packets that had for the previous centuries served the river's many landings and docks along the  tidal reach.

The Washington Suburban Sanitary Commission constructed two dams on the main branch in the mid-twentieth century. Brighton Dam was constructed  from the Chesapeake in 1943, impounding the waters of Triadelphia Reservoir; in 1952 the T. Howard Duckett Dam was constructed  farther downstream, near Laurel, thus creating Rocky Gorge Reservoir. The land surrounding the two reservoirs is administered by the WSSC, creating a forested reserve of  accessible to the public for horseback riding, hunting, fishing, and picnicking in limited areas. The state of Maryland classifies the T. Howard Duckett Dam as "high hazard" because large releases of water flood areas of North Laurel.

With public recreational land on one or both shores of 74 of the river's 115 miles including the reservoir land, the impact that recreation in natural settings now has on the river's economy is obvious. The Patuxent Naval Air Station at the mouth of the river has continued to grow during past decades along with tourism, providing another main economic engine in the lower river valley that includes the popular boating center of Solomons.

Environmental concerns
According to EcoHealth Report Cards, the Patuxent River has a below average health rating, scoring a 38%, compared to the Chesapeake's over all health rating of 54%, as of 2016. However, the river does have higher ratings in dissolved oxygen, and likely, will soon have higher ratings in phosphorus.

The Middle and Little Patuxent watersheds include nearly all of Columbia, Maryland, including its downtown urban Lake Kittamaqundi and Wilde Lake. Columbia is a large planned community in Howard County that opened in 1967. Columbia's major downtown roadway is called Little Patuxent Parkway, and Maryland Route 175 in East Columbia was known as the Patuxent Parkway until May 2006, when it was renamed for Columbia's founder, the late James Rouse, and his wife, Patty. It was the largely unchecked erosion from this late 1960s and 1970s building spree that contributed the bulk of the Patuxent River's highest and most damaging sediment, siltation, and pollution levels to date downstream. This in turn led to a nearly complete destruction of a once thriving seafood industry along the brackish portion of the river.

"The Patuxent River has known no greater friend, advocate, and defender than Bernie Fowler." Fowler, as an early-1970s Calvert County commissioner, led the way in a lawsuit filed by downriver Charles, Calvert and St. Mary's counties against upriver counties. The lawsuit forced the state, the upriver counties, and the U.S. Environmental Protection Agency to enact pollution control measures. Between 1985 and 2005, the Patuxent saw a 26% decrease in nitrogen, a 46% decrease in phosphorus, and a 35% reduction in sediment, despite urban areas increasing to 31% of the watershed by 2002. Of the Chesapeake's major tributaries, the Patuxent is the only one having most of its harmful phosphorus and nitrogen nutrient overloads coming from urban runoff. The river's other two largest contributors, point sources (industrial, sewage, etc.) and the declining (24%) agricultural areas, contribute less of the nutrient load. Forested areas account for 43% of the watershed.

In 2004, Fred Tutman became the first "Riverkeeper" for the Patuxent. The mission of the Patuxent Riverkeeper organization, a member of the worldwide Waterkeeper Alliance, is to protect and improve the quality of the river's water and watershed and provide access and education at its facility in Nottingham.

Over the past 50 years, nationally recognized land preservation efforts in this part of Maryland have saved tens of thousands of acres from the Baltimore-Washington bedroom community sprawl. It is located midway between these two cities. The contiguous public area of  centered on Jug Bay,  upriver from the Chesapeake, form the fifth largest such Baltimore-D.C. preserve and largest tidewater one and consist of the Jug Bay Wetlands Sanctuary, the Merkle Wildlife Sanctuary, and the Jug Bay component of the Patuxent River Park. The  Patuxent River State Park in the uppermost part of the basin is the seventh largest.

Chesapeake Bay Week video releases, 2022
On 20 April 2022, PBS released a 26 minute documentary: " Troubled Tributary: Maryland's Patuxent River" - The Patuxent River is a crucial tributary of the Chesapeake Bay. Despite the central role the river has played in the history of the Bay's environmental movement and abundant conservation resources funneled to it over the years, it remains polluted. Its riverkeeper, Fred Tutman, believes that environmental injustice exists along its banks.On 21 April 2022, PBS released a 56 minute special: "The Chesapeake Bay Summit 2022" - Experts, scientists and policy makers converge for a compelling discussion on the health of the Chesapeake Bay watershed, led by host Frank Sesno.''

Bridges

See also
 List of parks in the Baltimore–Washington metropolitan area – many parks listed are along the Patuxent River

References

External links

 – Montgomery County Department of Environmental Protection
Patuxent River State Park (upper river)

Patuxent River Park in Prince George's County (mid-river, west shore)

Jug Bay Wetlands Sanctuary in Anne Arundel County (mid-river, east shore)

 (mid-river, both shores)

 
Rivers of Anne Arundel County, Maryland
Rivers of Calvert County, Maryland
Rivers of Charles County, Maryland
Rivers of Howard County, Maryland
Rivers of Maryland
Rivers of Montgomery County, Maryland
Rivers of Prince George's County, Maryland
Rivers of St. Mary's County, Maryland
Tributaries of the Chesapeake Bay